This is an incomplete list of newspapers published in Zambia.

Newspapers 
 Lusaka Times
 Times of Zambia
Zambian Business Times (ZBT)
 Zambia Daily Mail
 Zambian Watchdog
 News Diggers
 The Mast
 Daily Nation 
 New Vision
 Kachepa
 The Globe Newspaper Zambia
 Mwebantu
 Lusaka Voice
 The Seal Newspapers
 Zambia News 24
 The Independent Observer
 Sunday Mail
 Sunday Times
 Lusaka Star

See also
 Media in Zambia

External links
 
https://zambia.misa.org/media-directory/

  
Zambia
Lists of mass media in Zambia